

Incumbents
Monarch: Joseph I

Events
April 26-July 9 - Siege of Ciudad Rodrigo: French Marshal Michel Ney takes the fortified city from Field Marshal Don Andrés Perez de Herrasti
July 11 - Combat of Barquilla: Robert Craufurd attacks French grenadiers covering a foraging party. The French grenadiers make a fighting withdrawal and escape unscathed.
September 14 - Battle of La Bisbal: A Spanish division led by Henry O'Donnell (also known as Enrique José O'Donnell) and supported by an Anglo-Spanish naval squadron led by Francis William Fane and Charles William Doyle surprises an Imperial French brigade commanded by François Xavier de Schwarz. 
September 16 - The Mexican War of Independence begins with the "Grito de Dolores", as Miguel Hidalgo y Costilla and fellow rebels take up arms against the Spanish colonial authorities.

Births
August 28 - Jaime Balmes, priest and philosopher (died 1848)
December 17 - Francisco Serrano, 1st Duke of la Torre

Deaths
January 21 - Mariano Álvarez de Castro, military governor (born 1749)

References

 
1810s in Spain
Years of the 19th century in Spain